Halichoeres pardaleocephalus, the lineblotch wrasse, is a species of salt water wrasse found in the Indo-West Pacific.

Size

References

pardaleocephalus
Taxa named by Pieter Bleeker
Fish described in 1849